Andy Jardine was a Scottish footballer who played during the 1950s and 1960s.  He started his career with junior side Port Glasgow before signing 'senior' with Dumbarton in 1957.  Here he was a constant in the Dumbarton defence for over 10 years.

References

Scottish footballers
Dumbarton F.C. players
Scottish Football League players
Association football fullbacks
1935 births
2014 deaths